Catamount Peak is a  mountain located in Glacier National Park in British Columbia, Canada. It is approximately midway between Revelstoke and Golden. Neighbors include Cheops Mountain,  to the east, and Ursus Major Mountain,  to the northeast. Precipitation runoff from the mountain's south slope drains to Illecillewaet River via Cougar Brook, and the north slope drains to the Beaver River via Ursus Creek. This peak is visible from the Trans-Canada Highway.

Etymology

Catamount Peak was so named by a Dominion Topographic Survey party that made the first ascent of this peak in 1902, in keeping with the wildcat naming theme of nearby peaks such as Cougar Mountain and Bagheera Mountain. "Catamount" is shortened from the 17th-century "cat-of-the-mountain", and is synonymous with cougar, mountain lion, or any variety of wild cat. The mountain's toponym was officially adopted on March 31, 1917, by the Geographical Names Board of Canada.

Climate

Based on the Köppen climate classification, Catamount Peak is located in a subarctic climate zone with cold, snowy winters, and mild summers. Winter temperatures can drop below −20 °C with wind chill factors below −30 °C.

See also
 
 Geography of British Columbia

References

External links
 Weather: Catamount Peak

Two-thousanders of British Columbia
Selkirk Mountains
Glacier National Park (Canada)
Columbia Country
Kootenay Land District